Khorkhora may refer to:
 Khorkhora, East Azerbaijan
 Khorkhora, West Azerbaijan